Arnell Engstrom (1897-1970) was an American businessman and politician. He was the co-owner of the Engstrom-Hicks Insurance Agency. He served as a Republican member of the Michigan House of Representatives from 1940 to 1968.

References

1897 births
1970 deaths
People from Traverse City, Michigan
Businesspeople from Michigan
American businesspeople in insurance
Republican Party members of the Michigan House of Representatives
20th-century American politicians
20th-century American businesspeople